Andrew Speroff (born May 19, 1988) is an American former pair skater. With partner Gretchen Donlan, he is the 2013 Ondrej Nepela Trophy champion, 2013 Ice Challenge champion, and 2012 U.S. national pewter medalist.

Personal life 
Born in New Jersey, Speroff was raised in Cleveland until age ten when his family moved to Colorado Springs, Colorado. He moved to Boston in 2009 to train with Donlan. He has a college degree in sports management. He married pair skater Kylie Duarte on October 8, 2018.

Career 
Speroff began skating when he was eight. At age thirteen, he began training in the pairs discipline with Rachael Flatt, who would be his partner for over three years. In 2001, Speroff had stress fractures in his lower back. The pair won the 2004 U.S. national title on the intermediate level before parting ways. Speroff had nerve damage in his shoulder in 2004. He later skated with Ariel Avant, Amanda Luchau, and Brittany Chase.

Speroff and Gretchen Donlan were paired together in spring 2009 by coach Bobby Martin. The pair made their international debut at the 2010 Nebelhorn Trophy where they finished 4th. They were 8th at the 2011 U.S. Championships.

Donlan/Speroff won the pewter medal at the 2012 U.S. Championships. The next season, they received a Grand Prix assignment, the 2012 Skate America, and finished 6th. The pair took the silver medal at the 2012 Ice Challenge.

In the 2013–14 season, Donlan/Speroff won gold medals at two international events, the 2013 Ondrej Nepela Trophy and 2013 Ice Challenge.

Speroff retired from competition in 2014. He then began skating on cruise ships in partnership with Kylie Duarte.

Programs 
(with Donlan)

Competitive highlights 
GP: Grand Prix

With Donlan

With Chase

With Luchau

With Flatt

References

External links 
 
 Gretchen Donlan / Andrew Speroff at IceNetwork
 Official website of Donlan / Speroff

1988 births
American male pair skaters
Living people
Sportspeople from Newark, New Jersey
20th-century American people
21st-century American people